Martin Ashley Bayless (born October 11, 1962) is a former American football cornerback/safety and American football coach who is the special teams coordinator and defensive backs coach for the Philadelphia Stars of the United States Football League (USFL). He played 13 seasons in the National Football League (NFL) and played college football at Bowling Green State University. He holds the record for most career interceptions in NCAA history with 27. After retiring from the NFL in 1998, he joined the Buffalo Bills as a Front Office Executive in 2000. He transitioned into coaching in the college ranks, and he has since held jobs with several professional football organizations.

In 2018, Bayless became the assistant special teams coordinator and secondary coach for the Birmingham Iron of the Alliance of American Football. The following year, he joined the XFL's Los Angeles Wildcats as special teams coordinator and safeties coach.

In 2022, Bayless joined the Philadelphia Stars of the United States Football League as the Defensive Backs coach and Special Teams coordinator.

References

External links
NFL.com player page

1962 births
Living people
Players of American football from Dayton, Ohio
American football safeties
Bowling Green Falcons football players
St. Louis Cardinals (football) players
Buffalo Bills players
San Diego Chargers players
Kansas City Chiefs players
Washington Redskins players
Houston Texans coaches
Sacramento Mountain Lions coaches
Birmingham Iron coaches
Los Angeles Wildcats coaches
Philadelphia Stars (2022) coaches